Bjørn Uldall (born April 10, 1994) is a Danish ice hockey player for Herning Blue Fox and the Danish national team. He participated at the 2015 IIHF World Championship.

References

External links

1994 births
Living people
Danish ice hockey defencemen
People from Herning Municipality
Sportspeople from the Central Denmark Region